The Abraham Castetter House is a historic house in Blair, Nebraska. It was built in 1876 for Abraham Castetter, who served as Washington County's county clerk and later founded The Banking House of A. Castetter. The house was designed in the Second Empire and Eclectic architectural styles. It has been listed on the National Register of Historic Places since June 25, 1982.

References

		
National Register of Historic Places in Washington County, Nebraska
Second Empire architecture in Nebraska
Eclectic architecture
Houses completed in 1876